HMS Itchen (K227) was a  of the Royal Navy (RN). Itchen was built to the RN's specifications as a Group I River-class frigate. She served in the North Atlantic during World War II.

As a River-class frigate, Itchen was one of 151 frigates launched between 1941 and 1944 for use as anti-submarine convoy escorts, named after rivers in the United Kingdom. The ships were designed by naval engineer William Reed, of Smith's Dock Company of South Bank-on-Tees, to have the endurance and anti-submarine capabilities of the  sloops, while being quick and cheap to build in civil dockyards using the machinery (e.g. reciprocating steam engines instead of turbines) and construction techniques pioneered in the building of the s. Its purpose was to improve on the convoy escort classes in service with the Royal Navy at the time, including the Flower class.

After commissioning in December 1942, Itchen participated in anti-submarine warfare exercises off Tobermory, Mull and Lough Foyle until mid September 1943 where she was assigned as convoy escort.

On 19 September 1943, Itchen was involved in the U-boat attack on Convoys ONS 18/ON 202. At 21:51 on 20 September,  was hit and sunk, with 81 survivors being picked up by Itchen. At 02:01 on the morning of 23 September,  fired a torpedo at Itchen which hit the ship after 70 seconds. The frigate blew up with loss of 230 lives and 3 survivors. These ships were some of the first victims of the newly developed GNAT torpedo.

References

External links 
 
 

 

1942 ships
River-class frigates of the Royal Navy
World War II frigates of the United Kingdom
Ships sunk by German submarines in World War II
World War II shipwrecks in the Atlantic Ocean
Naval magazine explosions